Orest Ihorovych Salamakha (born 25 March 1991) is a Ukrainian politician currently serving as a People's Deputy of Ukraine from Ukraine's 121st electoral district. He is a member of Servant of the People.

Early life and career 
Orest Ihorovych Salamakha was born on 25 March 1991 in the city of Lviv, then part of the Soviet Union. In 2013, he graduated from Lviv Polytechnic, specialising in logistics management.

Prior to his election, Salamakha worked as a manager in wholesale and retail trade, and was supply manager at Bud Invest Kom.

Political career 
In the 2019 Ukrainian parliamentary election, Salamakha ran as the candidate of Servant of the People for People's Deputy of Ukraine in Ukraine's 121st electoral district. At the time of his election, he was an independent. Salamakha was ultimately successful, defeating next-closest candidate Mykhailo Zadorozhnyi of European Solidarity with 19.76% of the vote to Zadorozhnyi's 16.25%.

In the Verkhovna Rada (Ukraine's parliament), Salamakha is a member of the Committee of the Verkhovna Rada on issues of budget. In March 2020, Salamakha was one of the People's Deputies to sign a letter opposing a proposal by the Trilateral Contact Group on Ukraine to include representatives of separatist groups from the Donbas in the government in an effort to solve the War in Donbas.

References 

1991 births
Living people
Ninth convocation members of the Verkhovna Rada
Politicians from Lviv
Servant of the People (political party) politicians